Mathematics and Mechanics of Complex Systems (MEMOCS) is a half-yearly peer-reviewed scientific journal founded by the International Research Center for the Mathematics and Mechanics of Complex Systems (M&MoCS) from Università degli Studi dell'Aquila, in Italy. It is published by Mathematical Sciences Publishers, and first issued in February 2013. The co-chairs of the editorial board are Francesco dell'Isola and Gilles Francfort, and chair managing editor is Martin Ostoja-Starzewski.

MEMOCS is indexed in Scopus, MathSciNet and Zentralblatt MATH.

It is open access, free of author charges (being supported by grants from academic institutions), and available in both printed and electronic forms.

Contents
MEMOCS publishes articles from diverse scientific fields with a specific emphasis on mechanics. Its contents rely on the application or development of rigorous mathematical methods.

The journal also publishes original research in related areas of mathematics of well-established applicability, such as variational methods, numerical methods, and optimization techniques, as well as papers focusing on and clarifying particular aspects of the history of mathematics and science.

Among the contributors are Graeme Milton, Geoffrey Grimmett, David Steigmann, Mario Pulvirenti and Lucio Russo.

References

External links
 
 Editorial Board
 International Research Center on Mathematics and Mechanics of Complex Systems - M&MoCS

Open access journals
Mathematical Sciences Publishers academic journals
Publications established in 2013
Mathematics journals
Physics journals
Engineering journals
History of science journals
English-language journals
Biannual journals